Going Sane is a 1987 Australian comedy starring John Waters. It was one of several films made in the 1980s where Waters plays a character who has a mid life crisis. In 1994 when asked to name his worst movie, Waters said Going Sane was the one "that failed to achieve its brief more than any other."

Production
Filming started 15 July 1985.

References

External links

Going Sane at Oz Movies

Australian comedy films
1987 films
1987 comedy films
1980s English-language films
1980s Australian films